Randy Minniear (born December 27, 1943) is a former American football running back. He played for the New York Giants from 1967 to 1969 and for the Cleveland Browns in 1970.

References

1943 births
Living people
American football running backs
Purdue Boilermakers football players
New York Giants players
Cleveland Browns players